KGGL (93.3 FM, "Eagle 93.3") is a commercial radio station in Missoula, Montana, airing a country music format. It is owned by Townsquare Media.

History

KDXT
On October 15, 1975, Rex Jensen filed with the Federal Communications Commission (FCC) for a construction permit to build a new radio station on 93.3 MHz in Missoula, with transmitter on Big Sky Mountain. The permit was granted on May 25, 1976, with the commission dismissing complaints by several other Missoula broadcasters that the new facility would cause interference to their operations. While the station was intended to launch that fall, equipment delivery and bad weather in the eastern United States prompted the project to be shelved for the winter; KDXT made its debut on April 29, 1977. Having been transferred to the Jensen Broadcasting Company (owned by Rex and his brother Jack), the station started with an automated rock/adult contemporary hybrid format.

The Jensens sold the station in February 1979 to a joint venture with Robert E. Ingstad of North Dakota, who became the sole owner in 1980 before KDXT and sister station KGRZ (1450 AM) were sold to Wind Point 1970 Holding Company, which was owned by the S.C. Johnson Company, in 1982. The two stations were then sold to Sunbrook Communications in 1986; during this time, the station dominated the Missoula radio market.

KGGL
Sunbrook sold its radio properties—ten in Montana and a pair in Wenatchee, Washington—to Seattle-based Fisher Broadcasting in 1994, with Sunbrook becoming a division of Fisher after the sale was completed. With the contemporary hit format long associated with KDXT in a national slump, Fisher opted to make a major change. It flipped KGGL to country, taking on established country outlet KYSS, in September 1995. This left Missoula without a station in the contemporary hit radio format. The format change was a successful one: the fall 2005 Eastlan radio ratings for Missoula showed KGGL tied with public radio station KUFM and beating third-place KYSS.

In a 24-station sale that was only partially completed, Fisher sold many of its small-market radio properties to Cherry Creek Radio in 2006 in order to fund an expansion into Spanish-language television in major Pacific Northwest markets. The 24 stations contributed just one-fourth of the radio division's revenue, with Fisher's three Seattle stations comprising the rest.

References

External links
Official Website

Radio stations established in 1977
Country radio stations in the United States
GGL
1977 establishments in Montana
Townsquare Media radio stations